Moe is a Norwegian toponymic surname.

People
 Benna Moe (1897–1983), Danish composer and musician
 Bente Moe (born 1960), retired Norwegian long-distance runner
 Bill Moe 	(1916–1998), American professional ice hockey player 
 Bjørn Moe, Danish martial arts fighter and real estate mogul
 Bjørg Tysdal Moe, Norwegian politician for the Christian Democratic Party
 Dawn Moe, Natal and South Africa cricketer
 Donald Moe (1942-2017), American politician
 Doug Moe, American basketball coach
 Eric Moe (ice hockey) (born 1988), Swedish ice hockey player
 Eric Moe (composer) (born 1954), American composer and pianist
 Finn Moe (1902–1971), Norwegian politician for the Labour Party
 Frank Moe (1965-2022), American politician and educator
 Harold "Hal" W. Moe (1910 –2001, American college football player 
 Jens Ulltveit-Moe, Norwegian businessperson 
 Jerry Moe, American author and Vice President at the Betty Ford Center
 John Moe,	American writer and reporter 
 Josefa Moe (1933–2006), entertainer and artist 
 Jørgen Moe (1813–1882), Norwegian author and bishop
 Karen Moe, American former butterfly swimmer 
 Knut Moe (1921–1989), Norwegian resistance member
 Knut Ivar Moe (born 1960), Norwegian curler and coach
 Kristin Moe, Norwegian politician for the Conservative Party 
 Lars Moe,	Norwegian veterinarian
 Michael K. Moe (born 1937), American physicist
 Mogens Moe (born 1944), Danish chess master
 Ola Borten Moe, Norwegian politician and MP for the Centre Party 
 Ole Moe, Norwegian black metal multi-instrumentalist 
 Olefine Moe (1850–1933), Norwegian opera singer, actress, and opera director 
 Peter Kjeldseth Moe (1909–1973), Norwegian politician for the Labour Party 
 Per Ivar Moe, Norwegian speed skater 
 Ragnvald Moe (1873–1965),	Norwegian historian
 Richard Moe, attorney
 Roger Moe (born 1944), American politician and a former majority leader of the Minnesota Senate
 Scott Moe, current Premier of Saskatchewan, Canada
 Tarjei Sandvik Moe, Norwegian actor and star of Skam
 Terje Moe (architect), Norwegian architect
 Terje Moe (painter) (1943–2004), Norwegian painter
 Terry Moe American Political Scientist 
 Tommy Moe, American former alpine ski racer
 Trygve Moe (journalist), Norwegian journalist
 Trygve Moe (politician) (1920–1998), Norwegian politician

See also
Moen (surname)
Meaux
note : As it was not uncommon for spellings to be simplified phonetically when immigrating to the United States. Meaux, the French surname was the origin of surname Moe** or Mow given to some of the immigrants to the United States who came from France in the 1600s.  (**Different ancestry than Moe or Moen surnames of Norwegian ancestry and origin.)
Mo (Chinese surname)
Mo (Korean surname)
Moes (surname)

Norwegian-language surnames